Gary Young may refer to:

Gary Young (Australian musician) (born 1947), founding member of Australian rock band Daddy Cool
Gary Young (footballer) (born 1958), Australian rules footballer
Gary Young (drummer) (born 1953), first drummer of the 1990s alternative rock band Pavement
Gary Young (poet) (born 1951), American poet and printer
Gary F. Young (born 1945), American politician from Idaho
Gary Young (screenwriter), British screenwriter
D. Gary Young (1949–2018), founder of Young Living Essential Oils

See also
Gary Younge (born 1969), British journalist
Garry Young (disambiguation)